Maira Khan (born 27 July 1984) is a Pakistani television actress, film actress, model and former VJ.

Her notable performances include Chambaili (2013 film),  (2016 film), Durj (2019 film), Cheekh (2019 TV Drama), Bewafa (2019). She was a contestant of reality show Tamasha which aired on ARY digital & ARY ZAP app, she was evicted towards the end of the show for trying to bite another constestant’s finger.

Early life
Maira Khan was born in Karachi, Pakistan on 27 July 1984 to actress Shakeela Anayat. She has one step brother and sister. Khan graduated from BAMM PECHS Karachi. She started her career as a child actor when she was only four years old.

Career 
Maira Khan first appeared in the hit TV serial Jaise Jante Nahin. Since then she has appeared on PTV, Indus TV, Hum TV, ARY TV, TV One, Geo TV serials. She has also appeared as a VJ on Play TV, and hosts her own talk show. She made her film debut in the 2013 political film Chambaili by Shehzad Nawaz and Ismail Jilani. Her character stands up for what's right and is the epitome of the strength of a woman.

Filmography

Films

Telefilm

Short film

Television

Anthology Series

Reality Show

Web series

Hosting

Music Video

Awards and nominations

References

External links 
 
 

Actresses from Karachi
Pakistani television actresses
21st-century Pakistani actresses
Living people
1984 births